Australian heraldry is the term for the style of armorial achievements, sometimes known as coats of arms, and other heraldic bearings and insignia used in Australia. It largely follows the Gallo-British tradition of heraldry also followed in England, Scotland, Ireland, Canada and New Zealand.

Heraldic authority 
Australia does not presently have its own independent heraldic authority which grants or records arms, though the College of Arms in London claims to be "the official heraldic authority for...Australia".

Heraldic authority for Australia is officially vested in the Sovereign of Australia, who can delegate that authority to whosoever they choose. However, the Australian government has not confirmed that such a delegation to the College of Arms has been made.

In response to questions submitted by the Australian Heraldry Society, on 7 February 2018 Prime Minister Malcolm Turnbull stated:

Grants of heraldic arms to Australian residents or institutions may be made, depending on their eligibility, by the English College of Arms, Scottish Court of the Lord Lyon, Chief Herald of Ireland, Chief Herald of Canada, State Herald of South Africa or the various authorities in Spain, Belgium, Russia or other places.

Coats of arms 
The heraldry of Australia has added indigenous Australian animals to the existing heraldic bestiary, along with native plants and occasionally traditional motifs of Aboriginal Australians and Torres Strait Islanders.

National arms

Arms of states and territories

Civic arms

Personal arms

Corporate/Institutional arms

Badges

Heraldry Society 
The Australian Heraldry Society was founded in Melbourne in 1992, originally as Heraldry Australia before changing its name in 2008. The society has its roots in the Australian branch of The Heraldry Society of England, which was established in Melbourne in 1973.

The object of the society is “to promote the advancement of education in the science, art, history, practice and development of heraldry and allied subjects and the encouragement of their study and practice in Australia.” They produce a bi-monthly newsletter, called The Red Escutcheon, and a triannual journal, called Heraldry in Australia.

References

External links 

 The Australian Heraldry Society
 The College of Arms
 Australian heraldry on Heraldry of the World

Australian heraldry
Australian culture
Heraldry by country